The Midway Range is a subrange of the Monashee Mountains, located between the Kettle and Granby Rivers in British Columbia, Canada.

References

Midway Range in the Canadian Mountain Encyclopedia

Monashee Mountains
Boundary Country